Chatham is a town in Jackson Parish, Louisiana, United States. The population was 557 at the 2010 census. It is part of the Ruston Micropolitan Statistical Area.

Southwest of Chatham is Caney Lake and the Jimmie Davis State Park.
'

Geography
Chatham is located at  (32.309036, -92.451359).

Demographics

2020 census

As of the 2020 United States census, there were 491 people, 316 households, and 157 families residing in the town.

2000 census
As of the census of 2000, there were 623 people, 257 households, and 169 families residing in the town. The racial makeup of the town was 55.22% White, 44.30% African American, and 0.48% from two or more races.

There were 257 households, out of which 30.7% had children under the age of 18 living with them, 39.7% were married couples living together, 22.6% had a female householder with no husband present, and 33.9% were non-families. 31.1% of all households were made up of individuals, and 13.2% had someone living alone who was 65 years of age or older. The average household size was 2.42 and the average family size was 3.02.

In the town, the population was spread out, with 26.5% under the age of 18, 12.5% from 18 to 24, 24.7% from 25 to 44, 21.8% from 45 to 64, and 14.4% who were 65 years of age or older. The median age was 34 years. For every 100 females, there were 95.3 males. For every 100 females age 18 and over, there were 86.9 males.

The median income for a household in the town was $19,500, and the median income for a family was $22,500. Males had a median income of $23,194 versus $16,406 for females. The per capita income for the town was $10,415. About 31.2% of families and 30.6% of the population were below the poverty line, including 41.0% of those under age 18 and 22.0% of those age 65 or over.

References

External links
Town of Chatham 

Towns in Jackson Parish, Louisiana
Towns in Louisiana
Ruston, Louisiana micropolitan area